Sharif Al-Nawaisheh is a Jordanian footballer who plays for Qadsia and the Jordan national football team.

International career
Al-Nawaisheh's first match with the Jordan national team was against Trinidad and Tobago on 16 June 2015 at Irbid in an international friendly, which ended in a 3-0 win for Jordan.

International career statistics

References

External links 

whoscored.com

Living people
Jordan international footballers
Jordanian expatriate footballers
Expatriate footballers in Kuwait
Al-Ramtha SC players
1987 births
Jordanian footballers
Association football forwards
Jordanian expatriate sportspeople in Kuwait
That Ras Club players
Qadsia SC players
Kuwait Premier League players